The Federal City Express was an Australian passenger train operated by the New South Wales Government Railways between Sydney and Canberra from September 1936 until May 1955.

Initially hauled by steam locomotives, the Monday to Thursday was taken over by Silver City Comet stock from October 1939 for a few years when increasing demand necessitated it be steam hauled again.

It was replaced in May 1955 by the Canberra Monaro Express.

References

Named passenger trains of Australia
Passenger rail transport in New South Wales
Railway services introduced in 1936
Railway services discontinued in 1955
Transport in the Australian Capital Territory
1936 establishments in Australia
1955 disestablishments in Australia
Discontinued railway services in Australia